The family Thaumetopoeidae—the "processionary moths"—comprises about 100 species, of which three have been recorded in Great Britain:

 Thaumetopoea pityocampa, pine processionary — probably rare immigrant (otherwise imported)
 Thaumetopoea processionea, oak processionary — immigrant
 [Trichocercus sparshalli, local long-tailed satin — probably imported (Australian species)]

See also
List of moths of Great Britain (overview)
Family lists: Hepialidae, Cossidae, Zygaenidae, Limacodidae, Sesiidae, Lasiocampidae, Saturniidae, Endromidae, Drepanidae, Thyatiridae, Geometridae, Sphingidae, Notodontidae, Thaumetopoeidae, Lymantriidae, Arctiidae, Ctenuchidae, Nolidae, Noctuidae and Micromoths

References 
 Waring, Paul, Martin Townsend and Richard Lewington (2003) Field Guide to the Moths of Great Britain and Ireland. British Wildlife Publishing, Hook, UK. .

Moths
Britain